Wrest Park is a country estate located in Silsoe, Bedfordshire, England. It comprises Wrest Park, a Grade I listed country house, and Wrest Park Gardens, also Grade I listed, formal gardens surrounding the mansion.

History
Thomas Carew (1595–1640) wrote his country house poem "To My Friend G.N. from Wrest" in 1639 that described the old house which was demolished between 1834 and 1840.

The present house was built in 1834–39, to designs by its owner Thomas de Grey, 2nd Earl de Grey (1781–1859), an amateur architect and the first president of the Royal Institute of British Architects, who was inspired by buildings he had seen on trips to Paris. He based his house on designs published in French architectural books such as Jacques-François Blondel's Architecture Française (1752). The works were superintended as clerk of works on site by James Clephan, who had been clerk of the works at the Liddell seat, Ravensworth Castle in County Durham, and had recently served as professional amanuensis and builder for Lord Barrington.

Although Nikolaus Pevsner previously stated that Clephan was a French architect who designed the present house instead of De Grey the amateur architect, as Charles Read has shown in his biography of De Grey, Clephan (born Clapham) in fact only produced drawings of the service infrastructure, such as plumbing and drainage. The decorative layout and features of the house were produced by De Grey's own hand.

Wrest has some of the earliest Rococo Revival interiors in England. Reception rooms in the house are open to the public.

Nan Ino Cooper ran Wrest Park as a military hospital during World War I, though a fire in September 1916 halted this usage of the house. Following the death of her brother Auberon Herbert, 9th Baron Lucas, she inherited his title and the house and sold it in 1918. It was sold after the War to Mr JG Murray, who was associated with cricket in Bedfordshire. During his 18-year tenure, much of the garden statuary was sold, while extensive felling stripped park and garden of many of their oldest trees.

He sold it to Sun Alliance Insurance in 1939, and after the Second World War it became a centre for modern agricultural engineering research.

English Heritage took over the house and gardens in 2006 and began a 20-year restoration project to return the gardens to their pre-1917 state.

Wrest Park Gardens

The park is divided by a wide gravel central walk, continued as a long canal that leads to a Baroque pavilion banqueting house designed by Thomas Archer and completed in 1711. The garden designer Batty Langley was employed in the 1730s. The interior of the pavilion is decorated with an impressive Ionic columns in trompe-l'œil.  Boundary canals were altered to take the more natural shape by Capability Brown, who worked there between 1758 and 1760, and who also ringed the central formal area with a canal and woodland. The gardens and garden houses were mapped by John Rocque in 1735.  During the later 18th and 19th centuries, an orangery and marble fountains were added. The Bathhouse (sometimes referred to as a Roman bath, a hermitage and a grotto) was built, and its grounds laid out, between about 1769 and 1772.

In 1736 Horace Walpole visited Wrest on a progress through Northamptonshire and Bedfordshire. He noted monuments in the garden in memory of the Duke of Kent's children who all predeceased him, as well as a monument to Kent himself, at that time still alive.

A Wellingtonia planted in 1856 was in its earlier years brought into the house annually to serve as a Christmas tree, one of the earliest surviving examples known in the U.K.

Restoration programme

In the autumn of 2007 English Heritage announced that the Wolfson Foundation had pledged up to £400,000 towards the restoration of a number of the key features of the Wrest Park estate, including the mansion's formal entrance area, the garden statuary, railings and gates, and to alter the height of the carriage drive. In the next phases the lakes and canals will be restored.

On 12 September 2008 English Heritage unveiled extensive plans to restore the Grade-I-listed Wrest Park house and gardens to their original splendour. In 2008 the music video for "The Fear" by Lily Allen featured interior as well as exterior scenes of Wrest Park.

In July 2010 English Heritage announced that it had secured over £1m from the Heritage Lottery Fund to develop a new visitors centre, car parking, exhibition space and accessible paths. Work was completed in summer 2011 and the park opened to the public on 4 August 2011.

English Heritage and Historic England have undertaken a number of indepth investigations of the gardens at Wrest as part of the restoration process, including archaeological and geophysical surveys. The removal of an overgrown yew hedge, which maps suggested existed in 1717, led to a dendrochronological investigation on the trunks to discover if the trees removed were original or part of later re-plantings. The wood was found to date to 1780–1800.

Capability Brown memorial

There is a memorial column dedicated to Lancelot "Capability" Brown. It was originally placed near the Bowling Green House, which was remodelled by Batty Langley in 1735, but is now located in the eastern part of the gardens. The column has the inscription: "These gardens, originally laid out by Henry Duke of Kent, were altered by Philip Earl of Hardwicke and Jemima, Marchioness Grey with the professional assistance of Lancelot Brown Esq. in the years 1758, 1759, 1760."

Filming
Wrest Park has been used as a location for filming and events including: the video for the 2008 song "The Fear" by Lily Allen; a 2015 concert by Status Quo; Strictly Come Dancing ,"The People's Strictly for Comic Relief", which aired in 2015; and a 2016 episode of BBC's Flog It!.

See also
De Grey Mausoleum

Notes

Further reading
Nicola Smith, Wrest Park (1995), London: English Heritage, 
Linda Cabe Halpern, Wrest Park 1686–1730s: exploring Dutch influences in Garden History Journal, Vol 30. No 2 (2002)
Jean O’Neill, John Rocque as a guide to gardens in Garden History Journal, Vol 16, Np 1
James Collett-White, Inventories of Bedfordshire Country Houses 1714–1830 in Bedfordshire Historical Record Society, Vol 74, 1995
Charles Read, Earl de Grey, London: Willow Historical Monographs, 2007. 
A. F. Cirket (ed.), The Earl de Grey's account of the building of Wrest House in Bedfordshire Historical Record Society, Volume 59, 1980

External links

 Wrest Park's page at English Heritage
 Heritage Lottery fund announcement July 2010

Gardens in Bedfordshire
Country houses in Bedfordshire
Tourist attractions in Bedfordshire
English Heritage sites in Bedfordshire
Grade I listed houses
Grade I listed buildings in Bedfordshire
Grade I listed garden and park buildings
Gardens by Capability Brown
Rococo architecture in England